Winroth is a surname. Notable people with the surname include:

Anders Winroth (born 1965), Swedish-born American medievalist
Jon Winroth (1935–2006), American wine critic 
Lee Winroth (born 1998), Swedish footballer

See also
Weinroth